Serebryansk (Serebriansk) is a town in Zyryan District in East Kazakhstan Region of eastern Kazakhstan. Population:   The town is located on the right bank of the Irtysh River, downstream of the Bukhtarma Hydroelectric Power Plant.

History
Serebryansk was founded in 1953 as the urban-type settlement of Serebryanka. The purpose of the settlement was to host workers employed in the construction of the Bukhtarma Hydroelectric Power Plant. Previously, the village of Novo-Alexandrovka was located on the site of the settlement. On July 9, 1962 Serebryanka was granted town status within Zyryan District.

Economy

Industry
Serebryansk mainly serves the hydropower plant. There is also a chemical plant.

Transportation
The town is served by Serebryanka railway station on the railway connecting Oskemen and Zyryanovsk.

Serebryansk has access to the paved road which follows he right bank of the Irtysh and connects Oskemen and Zyryanovsk.

References

Populated places in East Kazakhstan Region